Jenny Pavley (born June 17, 1976, in Agoura Hills, California) is a beach volleyball player from  the United States. She won the silver medal in the women's beach team competition at the 1999 Pan American Games in Winnipeg, Manitoba, Canada, partnering Marsha Miller.

References
 

1976 births
Living people
American women's beach volleyball players
American women's volleyball players
Texas Tech Red Raiders women's volleyball players 
Beach volleyball players at the 1999 Pan American Games
Sportspeople from California
Pan American Games silver medalists for the United States
Pan American Games medalists in volleyball
Medalists at the 1999 Pan American Games
21st-century American women